Kadsurin is a bioactive isolate of Kadsura.

References

Benzodioxoles
Heterocyclic compounds with 4 rings
Acetate esters
Methoxy compounds